Komorowice may refer to the following places in Poland:
Komorowice, Strzelin County in Lower Silesian Voivodeship (south-west Poland)
Komorowice, Wrocław County in Lower Silesian Voivodeship (south-west Poland)
Komorowice, Greater Poland Voivodeship (west-central Poland)
Komorowice, Bielsko-Biała (south Poland)